The 2004 Conference USA baseball tournament was the 2004 postseason college baseball championship of the NCAA Division I Conference USA, held at Cougar Field in Houston, Texas, from May 26 through 30, 2004. The TCU Horned Frogs won the tournament and received the conference's automatic bid to the 2004 NCAA Division I baseball tournament. The tournament consisted of eight teams, with two double-elimination brackets, and a single-game final.

Regular season results

Records listed are conference play only. Marquette and DePaul did not field baseball teams. South Florida, Charlotte, Cincinnati, and Saint Louis did not make the tournament.

Bracket

 Bold indicates the winner of the game.
 Italics indicate that the team was eliminated from the tournament.

Finish order

All-tournament team

References

Tournament
Conference USA Baseball Tournament
Conference USA baseball tournament
Conference USA baseball tournament
Conference USA baseball tournament
Baseball competitions in Houston
College sports tournaments in Texas